Georgia-Mae Fenton (born 2 November 2000) is an English artistic gymnast and a member of both the British national gymnastics team and the England Commonwealth Games gymnastics squad. She is the 2018 and 2022 Commonwealth champion on uneven bars, and a member of the gold-medal winning England team in 2022. With Great Britain, she was part of the team that won silver at both the 2022 European Women's Artistic Gymnastics Championships and 2022 World Artistic Gymnastics Championships.

Domestically, Fenton is a four-time English champion and a two-time British champion.

Early life
Fenton was inspired to start gymnastics after watching Beth Tweddle compete at the 2008 Summer Olympics. She also trained in ballet at a young age.

Senior career

2016
Fenton became age-eligible for senior competition in 2016. In March, she competed at her first senior English Championships, where she took the bronze medal on floor exercise behind Claudia Fragapane and Amy Tinkler despite breaking her hand a month before. At the British Championships in April, she finished seventh in the all-around, sixth on floor and eighth on the uneven bars.

2017
In March, Fenton placed fourth in the all-around at the British Championships, and took the silver medal on the uneven bars behind Ellie Downie. She was then set to compete at the London World Cup, but was forced to withdraw due to a foot injury. She returned to competition at the Varna World Challenge Cup in Bulgaria, where she picked up the silver medal in the balance beam final behind Brazil's Daniele Hypólito. Additionally, she finished sixth in the uneven bars final and seventh in the floor final. She next competed at the Paris World Challenge Cup, where she placed seventh in the uneven bars final.

Fenton represented Great Britain at the 2017 World Championships in Montreal. In the qualification round, she finished tenth on the uneven bars, and was the first reserve for the final. At the World Championships, Fenton and Belgium's Nina Derwael became the first gymnasts to successfully compete a stalder to straddle tkatchev release move with a half turn on the uneven bars. As a result, the skill was named the "Derwael-Fenton" in the Code of Points.

2018
At the English Championships, Fenton placed third in the all-around behind Amy Tinkler and Claudia Fragapane. She was selected to represent England at the 2018 Commonwealth Games on the Gold Coast alongside Lucy Stanhope, Alice Kinsella, Kelly Simm and Taeja James. They took the silver medal in the team competition behind Canada. Individually, Fenton claimed her first significant senior championship win with gold on the uneven bars.

At the European Championships in Glasgow, the British team of Fenton, Stanhope, Kinsella, Simm and James finished fourth in the team final behind Russia, France and the Netherlands. Fenton also qualified to the floor final, where she finished eighth. She next competed at the World Championships in Doha, but did not advance to any individual finals. The British team was the first reserve for the team final.

2019
Fenton started her season at the English Championships, where she finished fourth in the all-around and placed first on floor. She then competed at the British Championships, where she won the gold medals on bars and beam, and finished fifth in the all-around. In June, Fenton competed at the European Games in Minsk, where she placed eighth in the all-around final and fifth in the balance beam final. At the Paris World Challenge Cup in September, Fenton finished seventh in the uneven bars final and fifth in the beam final.

Fenton was selected to compete at the World Championships in Stuttgart. The British team qualified to the team final, where they finished sixth. They also earned a team berth for the 2020 Summer Olympics in Tokyo.

2020–21
In March 2020, Fenton competed at the Baku World Cup, but did not advance to the finals, which were later canceled due to the COVID-19 pandemic. She did not compete during the remainder of 2020 due to the impacts of the pandemic.

In June 2021, Fenton was named the alternate to the British team for the postponed 2020 Olympic Games.

In September, Fenton won the all-around on both days of the British Worlds Trials and was selected to compete at the 2021 World Championships in Kitakyushu. She qualified to the all-around final, where she finished seventeenth.

2022
In March, Fenton placed third in the all-around at the English Championships, as well as first on bars and beam. She went on to take the silver on bars and the bronze on beam at the British Championships.

Fenton was again selected to represent England at the Commonwealth Games and went on to win team gold alongside Ondine Achampong, Claudia Fragapane, Alice Kinsella, and Kelly Simm. She became the first woman in Commonwealth history to retain her individual uneven bars title, winning gold in the uneven bars final in Birmingham.

Following the Commonwealth Games, Fenton was also selected to represent Great Britain at the European Championships in Munich alongside Kinsella, Achampong, Jennifer Gadirova, and Jessica Gadirova. In the team final, the British team took the silver medal behind Italy. Individually, Fenton qualified to the uneven bars final, where she finished sixth.

In September Fenton was named to the team to compete at the 2022 World Championships, once again alongside the Gadirova twins, Achampong, and Kinsella.  During the team final Fenton competed on uneven bars and balance beam, helping Great Britain win the silver medal and achieve their highest placement at a World Championships.

Eponymous skills

Competitive history

References

External links 
 
 
 

2000 births
Living people
British female artistic gymnasts
English female artistic gymnasts
Commonwealth Games medallists in gymnastics
Commonwealth Games gold medallists for England
Commonwealth Games silver medallists for England
Gymnasts at the 2018 Commonwealth Games
European Games competitors for Great Britain
Gymnasts at the 2019 European Games
Originators of elements in artistic gymnastics
Sportspeople from Gravesend, Kent
Gymnasts at the 2022 Commonwealth Games
Medalists at the World Artistic Gymnastics Championships
21st-century British women
Medallists at the 2018 Commonwealth Games
Medallists at the 2022 Commonwealth Games